The Godless Girl (1928) is an American dramatic silent film directed by Cecil B. DeMille, shown for years as his last completely silent film. The cast features Lina Basquette, Marie Prevost, Tom Keene and Noah Beery.

Plot
This drama features a romance between two different teenagers: a young atheist girl, Judith Craig, and the male head of a Christian youth organization, Bob Hathaway. The two leaders and their groups attack each other, starting a riot that kills a young girl. Followed by a goofy boy, Bozo, the three are thrown into a juvenile prison with a cruel head guard and bad living conditions. The film maker makes a point of talking about the truth of prison cruelty in the middle of the movie.

Bob, who is in love with Judy, eventually rescues her and takes shelter in an old farm where Judy, breath-taken by the romance and beauty of the forest, realizes there must be a God. They are found and taken back to prison and held in solitary confinement until a fire breaks out. Mame is Judy's new friend who is trying to get her out before she burns. But the rest of the prison girls escape. Bob, who is trusting in God to help them, finally rescues Judy with the help of Mame and Bozo; they also rescue the cruel head guard who pleads for his life and, as he is dying, sets them free for their kind act and rescue. At the very end, Bozo and Mame seem to end up together while Bob and Judy and their rekindled faith ride off together as the movie ends.

Cast
Lina Basquette... Judy Craig - The Girl
Marie Prevost... Mame - The Other Girl
Tom Keene... Bob Hathaway - The Boy (as George Duryea)
Noah Beery... The Brute
Eddie Quillan... Samuel 'Bozo' Johnson - The Goat
Mary Jane Irving... The Victim
Hedwiga Reicher... Prison Matron (as Hedwig Reicher)
Clarence Burton... Prison Guard
Richard Alexander ... Prison Guard (as Dick Alexander)
Kate Price... Prison Matron
Julia Faye ... Inmate
Viola Louie... Inmate
Emily Barrye... Inmate

Production
The film was inspired by a real-life incident at Hollywood High School when a student called Queen Silver started an atheist society. She was a child prodigy and socialist orator, accused of leaving atheist pamphlets in student lockers at Hollywood High School in 1927. The lead actress, Lina Basquette, named her autobiography, Lina: DeMille's Godless Girl, after the film.

The UCLA Film and Television Archive later restored the film's sound version, in which dialogue scenes were added to the final reel, a film that was one of DeMille's first part-sound efforts. Actor Fritz Feld filmed the sound sequences without DeMille's supervision since DeMille had already broken his contract with Pathé, and signed with Metro-Goldwyn-Mayer.

Reception
The film was very popular in the U.S.S.R. and in Germany. The film's popularity in the Soviet Union is believed in part to be due to the fact that the USSR's film censors edited out the main character's conversion to Christianity near the end of the movie. It was a box office disaster in the US. When released in August 1928 in its silent film version, it was not a success. DeMille attributed the film's failure to its already outmoded position in the transition from silent to sound cinema. Nor did it recover more than two-thirds of its production costs when released in a so-called "goat gland" version with the addition of a final talkie reel in 1929.

Preservation status
In 2007, a version was released by Photoplay Productions and George Eastman House, in association with the Cecil B. DeMille Foundation and Film4, restored from deMille's own nitrate print, with a new music score by Carl Davis.

Notes

External links

allmovie/synopsis
The Godless Girl at Virtual History
UCLA Graduate Student Film Programming: The Crank
The Godless Girl at Turner Classic Movies

1928 films
1928 drama films
Silent American drama films
American black-and-white films
Films directed by Cecil B. DeMille
Transitional sound drama films
1920s prison films
Films about Christianity
Films with atheism-related themes
American silent feature films
Pathé Exchange films
1920s English-language films
1920s American films
Silent horror films